The Broken Earth is an American film written and directed by Roman Freulich in 1939. The 11-minute short film stars Clarence Muse as a sharecropper and widower who plows his farm and tries to care for a sick son, pleading and praying for divine intervention. The film includes a soundtrack of negro spirituals.

Freulich was a photographer who immigrated from Poland. He shot movie stills and glamour shots, along with shooting the film with dramatic angels. The film is extant.

Muse owned a ranch that was used as a filmmaking location.

The Southern Methodist University Libraries have the film in their collection The film was screened in 2007 and discussed by Morgan State University professor Thomas Cripps.

References

1939 films
1939 short films
American black-and-white films
1930s English-language films